Tom Reyners (born 12 October 20 April 2000) is a Belgian professional footballer who plays as a winger for Challenger Pro League club Beveren.

Professional career
A youth product of Genk, Reyners signed a professional contract with Waasland-Beveren in June 2020. Reyners made his professional debut with Waasland-Beveren in a 4-1 Belgian First Division A loss to S.V. Zulte Waregem on 22 August 2020.

References

External links
 
 ACFF Profile

2000 births
Living people
Belgian footballers
Belgium youth international footballers
S.K. Beveren players
Belgian Pro League players
Challenger Pro League players
Association football wingers
People from Bree, Belgium